The Punic language, also called Phoenicio-Punic or Carthaginian, is an extinct variety of the Phoenician language, a Canaanite language of the Northwest Semitic branch of the Semitic languages. An offshoot of the Phoenician language of coastal West Asia (modern Lebanon and western Syria), it was principally spoken on the Mediterranean coast of Northwest Africa, and the Iberian peninsula and several Mediterranean islands such as Malta, Sicily and Sardinia by the Punic people, or western Phoenicians, throughout classical antiquity, from the 8th century BC to the 6th century AD.

Punic is considered to have separated from its Phoenician parent around the time that Carthage became the leading Phoenician city under Mago I, but scholarly attempts to delineate the dialects lack precision and generally disagree on the classification.

History
The Punics stayed in contact with the homeland of Phoenicia until the destruction of Carthage by the Roman Republic in 146 BC. At first, there was not much difference between Phoenician and Punic, but as time went on Punic began to become influenced less by Phoenicia and more by the coastal Berber languages spoken in and around Carthage by the ancient Libyans.

The term Neo-Punic is used in two senses: One pertaining to the Phoenician alphabet and the other to the language itself. In the present context, Neo-Punic refers to the dialect of Punic spoken after the fall of Carthage and after the Roman conquest of the former Punic territories in 146 BC. The dialect differed from the earlier Punic language, as is evident from divergent spelling compared to earlier Punic and by the use of non-Semitic names, mostly of Libyco-Berber or Iberian origin. The difference was due to the dialectal changes that Punic underwent as it spread among the Berber peoples. Neo-Punic works include Lepcis Magna N 19 (= KAI 124; 92 AD).

By around the fourth century AD, Punic was still spoken in what is now Tunisia and Algeria, other parts of Northwest Africa, and the Mediterranean. The Neo-Punic alphabet also descended from the Punic language. By around 400, the first meaning of Punic was used mainly for monumental inscriptions, replaced by the cursive Neo-Punic alphabet elsewhere. Examples of Punic literary works are those of Mago, a Punic general with great notoriety, who spread Carthage's influence as much through writing books as he did fighting. Mago wrote 28 volumes about animal husbandry.

The Roman Senate appreciated the works so much that after taking Carthage, they presented them to Berber princes who owned libraries there. Mago's work was translated into Greek by Cassius Dionysius of Utica. The Latin version was probably translated from the Greek version. Further examples of Punic works of literature include the works of Hanno the Navigator, who wrote about his encounters during his naval voyages around Africa and about the settling of new colonies in Iberia, North Africa and the Mediterranean.

A third version of Punic, known as Latino-Punic, is Punic written in the Latin alphabet, but with all of the spellings favouring Northwest African pronunciation. Latino-Punic was spoken until the 3rd and the 4th centuries, and was recorded in seventy recovered texts.

Latino-Punic texts include the 1st-century Zliten LP1, or the second-century Lepcis Magna LP1. They were even written as late as the 4th century, Bir ed-Dreder LP2. Classical sources such as Strabo (63/4 BC – AD 24) mention the Phoenician conquest of Libya.

There is evidence that every form of Punic changed after 146 BC according to Sallust (86 – 34 BC), who claims Punic was "altered by their intermarriages with the Numidians". That account agrees with other evidence found to suggest a North-African influence on Punic, such as Libyco-Berber names in the Onomasticon of Eusebius. The last known testimony reporting Punic as a living language is that of Augustine of Hippo (d. 430).

Today there are a number of common Berber roots that descend from Punic, including the word for "learn" (*almid, *yulmad; compare Hebrew למד).

There are significant similarities between Neo-Punic and modern Maghrebi Arabic.

Description
Punic is known from inscriptions (most of them religious formulae) and personal name evidence. The play Poenulus by Plautus contains a few lines of vernacular Punic which have been subject to some research because unlike inscriptions, they largely preserve the vowels.

Augustine of Hippo is generally considered the last major ancient writer to have some knowledge of Punic and is considered the "primary source on the survival of [late] Punic". According to him, Punic was still spoken in his region (Northern Africa) in the 5th century, centuries after the fall of Carthage, and there were still people who called themselves "chanani" (Canaanite: Carthaginian) at that time. He wrote around 401:

Besides Augustine, the only proof of Punic-speaking communities at such a late period is a series of trilingual funerary texts found in the Christian catacombs of Sirte, Libya: the gravestones are carved in Ancient Greek, Latin and Punic. It might have even survived the Muslim conquest of the Maghreb, as the geographer al-Bakri describes a people speaking a language that was not Berber, Latin or Coptic in Sirte, where spoken Punic survived well past written use. However, it is likely that Arabization of Punic speakers was facilitated by their language belonging to the same group (both were Semitic languages) as that of the conquerors and so they had many grammatical and lexical similarities.

The idea that Punic was the origin of Maltese was first raised in 1565. Modern linguistics has proved that Maltese is in fact derived from Arabic, probably Siculo-Arabic specifically, with a large number of loanwords from Italian. However, Punic was indeed spoken on the island of Malta at some point in its history, as evidenced by both the Cippi of Melqart, which is integral to the decipherment of Punic after its extinction, and other inscriptions that were found on the islands. Punic itself, being Canaanite, was more similar to Modern Hebrew than to Arabic.

Like its Phoenician parent, Punic was written from right to left, in horizontal lines, without vowels.

Phonology
Punic has 22 consonants. Details of their pronunciation can be reconstructed from Punic and Neo-Punic texts written in Latin or Greek characters (inscriptions, and parts of Plautus's comedy Poenulus, 'The Little Punic').

Table of consonant phonemes

Vowels 
The vowels in Punic and Neo-Punic were: short a, i, and u; their long counterparts ā, ī, and ū; and ē and ō, which had developed out of the diphthongs ay and aw, respectively (for example Punic mēm, 'water', corresponds to Hebrew mayim).

Two vowel changes are noteworthy. In many cases a stressed long ā developed into /o/, for example in the third person masculine singular of the suffixing conjugation of the verb, baròk, 'he has blessed' (compare Hebrew baràk). And in some cases that /o/ secondarily developed into ū, for example mū, 'what?', < mō < mā (cf. Hebrew māh, 'what?').

In late Punic and Neo-Punic the glottal stop and pharyngeal and laryngeal consonants were no longer pronounced. The signs ’, ‘, h, and ḥ thus became available to indicate vowels. The ‘ayn (‘) came to be regularly used to indicate an /a/ sound, and also y and w increasingly were used to indicate /i/ and /o, u/, respectively. But a consistent system to write vowels never developed.

Grammar
In this section "Grammar" the notation "XX (xxxx)" is used, where  XX  is the spelling in Punic characters (without vowels), while xxxx is a phonetic rendering, including vowels, as can be reconstructed from Punic language texts written in the Latin or Greek alphabets.

Nouns 
Nouns, including adjectives, in Punic and Neo-Punic can be of two genders (masculine or feminine), three numbers (singular, dual, or plural), and in two 'states', the absolute state or the so-called construct state. A word in the construct state has a close relation with the word that follows, a relation that is often translated by "of". For example, in the combination "sons of Hanno", "sons of" would be in the construct state, while "Hanno" would be in the absolute state.

Morphology:

Pronouns

Demonstrative pronoun 
The demonstrative pronoun 'this, these' was:

Definite article 
The definite article was evolving from Phoenician ha- to an unaspirated article a-. By 406 BCE, both variants were attested in the same inscription (CIS I 5510). Although in later times the h- was no longer pronounced, the "historical" spelling H- kept being used, in addition to ’- and Ø-, and one even finds Ḥ-.

Personal pronoun 
The personal pronouns, when used on their own, are: (forms between [...] are attested in Phoenician only)

When used as a direct or indirect object ('me, him', 'to me, to him') or as a possessive ('mine, his') the personal pronoun takes the form of a suffix. These suffixes can be combined with verbal forms, substantives, and paricles.

Examples:
  ḤN (ḥan) = (verb:) 'he has shown favor' →
  ḤN’ (ḥannō) = 'he has shown favor to him (-ō)' = proper name Hanno
  ḤNYB‘L (ḥannī ba‘al) = (verb:) 'Ba‘al has shown favor to me (-ī)' = proper name Hannibal

  BN (bin) = 'son' →
  BN’, BNY (binō) = 'his son'

  ’T (’et) = 'with' (preposition) →
  ’TY (’ittī) = 'together with me'

The paradigm for the suffixed personal pronouns is:

Relative pronoun 
The relative pronoun, 'who, that, which', in both Punic and Neo-Punc is  ’Š  (’īs). In late Neo-Punic  M’  (mū) (originally an interrogative pronoun, 'what?') emerged as a second relative pronoun. Both pronouns were not inflected. The combination  ’Š M’  (’īs mū) was also used in late Neo-Punic.

Determinative pronoun 
A pronoun  Š-  (si-) was used to express an indirect genitival relationship between two substantives; it can be translated as 'of'. This uninflected pronoun was prefixed to the second of the two substantives. Example:
  HKHNT ŠRBTN  (ha-kohènet si-Rabat-ēn), 'the priestess of our Lady'

Interrogative pronoun 
There are two interrogative pronouns:
  MY (mī), 'who?' (cf. Hebrew mī)
  M’ (mū), 'what?' (cf. Hebrew māh). In Neo-Punic this pronoun is also used as a relative pronoun, 'that, which'.
Neither of the two pronouns was inflected.

Indefinite pronoun 
In Punic and Neo-Punic there was no exclusive indefinite pronoun. Whenever such a pronoun might be needed, it was circumscribed by means of words like  ’ḤD (’ḥḥad), 'one',  ’Š (’īs) or  ’DM (’adom), 'a man, a person', or  KL (kil), 'all'.

Verbs

Morphology 
The nucleus of Punic and Neo-Punic verbs is a "root" consisting of three or, sometimes, two consonants. By adding prefixes and suffixes, and by varying the vowels that are inserted into the root, the various forms of the verb are formed. These belong to six "stems" (conjugations). The basic, and most common, stem type is the Qal. The other common stems are:
 Niph‘al (the usual passive stem);
 Pi‘el (a so-called intensive stem);
 Yiph‘il (a causative stem; corresponds to the Hiph‘il stem in Hebrew).
A few other stems are found only very rarely:
 Qal Passive;
 Pu‘al (passive of the Pi‘el stem);
 Yitpe‘el (reflexive variant of the Pi‘el; Hebrew Hitpa‘el).

Qal 
The paradigm of the Qal is (the verb  B-R-K  (barok), 'to bless', is used as an example):
 (note 1:) “the verb barok”: barok literally means 'he blesses', it is tradition to consider the 3rd person masculine suffixing form as the standard form of the Punic verb;
 (note 2:) Forms between [...] are known from Phoenician, but have not yet been attested in Punic.

{| class="wikitable mw-collapsible mw-collapsed"
|-
! colspan="4" | Form !! (Neo-)Punic !! Translation !! (cf. Hebrew)
|-
| rowspan="9" valign="top" | Perfect(Suffixingform) || rowspan="5" valign="top" | Singular || 1 ||  ||  BRKT  (barakti) || = 'I bless' || baràkti
|-
| rowspan="2" valign="top" | 2 || masc. ||  BRKT  (barakta) || = 'you (m.) bless' || barákta
|-
| fem. || [ BRKT  (barakti) ] || = 'you (f.) bless' || barákt
|-
| rowspan="2" valign="top" | 3 || masc. ||  BRK  (barok) || = 'he blesses || barák|-
| fem. ||  BRK, BRK’, BRK‘  (berka) || = 'she blesses' || barekāh|-
| rowspan="4" valign="top" | Plural || 1 ||  ||  BRKN  (baraknu) || = 'we bless' || baràknū|-
| rowspan="2" valign="top" | 2 || masc. ||  BRKTM  (biraktim) || = 'you (m. pl.) bless' || beraktèm|-
| fem. || — (not attested) || 'you (f.) bless' || beraktèn|-
|  | 3 ||  ||  BRK  (barkū) || = 'they bless' || barekū|-
| rowspan="12" valign="top" | Imperfect(Prefixingform A)andIussive(Prefixingform B) || rowspan="5" valign="top" | Singular || 1 ||  ||  ’BRK  (’ebrok, ’ibrok) || = 'I will bless, let me bless' || ’ebròk|-
| rowspan="2" valign="top" | 2 || masc. ||  TBRK  (tibrok) || = 'you (m.) will bless, may you (m.) bless' || tibròk|-
| fem. || [ TBRKY  (tibrokī) ] || = 'you (f.) will bless, may you (f.) bless' || tibrekī|-
| rowspan="2" valign="top" | 3 || masc. ||  YBRK  (yibrok) || = 'he will bless, may he bless' || yibrok|-
| fem. || [ TBRK  (tibrok) ] || = 'she will bless, may she bless' || tibròk|-
| rowspan="7" valign="top" | Plural || 1 ||  ||  NBRK  (nibrok) || = 'we will bless, let us bless' || nibròk|-
| rowspan="3" valign="top" | 2 || rowspan="2" valign="top" | masc. ||  TBRKN  (tibrakūn) || = 'you (m. pl.) will bless' (imperfect) || rowspan="2" | tibrekū|-
|  TBRK  (tibrokū) || = 'may you (m. pl.) bless' (iussive)
|-
| fem. ||  YBRK  (yibrok) || = 'you (f. pl.) will bless, may you (f.) bless' || tibròknāh|-
| rowspan="3" valign="top" | 3 || rowspan="2" valign="top" | masc. || [  YBRKN  (yibrokūn) ] || = 'they (m.) will bless' (imperfect) || rowspan="2"| yibrekū|-
|  YBRK  (yibrokū) || = 'may they (m.) bless' (iussive)
|-
| fem. || — (not attested) || 'they (f.) will bless, may they (f.) bless' || tibròknāh|-
| rowspan="2" valign="top" | Cohortative (Prefixing form C) || Singular ||  | 1 ||  || — (not attested) || 'let me bless!' || ’ebrekāh|-
| Plural || 1 || || — (not attested) || 'let us bless!' || nibrekāh|-
| rowspan="4" valign="top" | Imperative || rowspan="2" valign="top" | Singular || rowspan="2" valign="top" | 2 || masc. ||  BRK  (borok) || = 'bless!, you (man) must bless' || berok|-
| fem. || [ BRK  (birkī) ] || = 'bless!, you (woman) must bless' || birkī|-
| rowspan="2" valign="top" | Plural || rowspan="2" valign="top" | 2 ||  masc. || — (not attested) || 'bless!, you (men) must bless' || birkū|-
| fem. || — (not attested) || 'bless!, you (women) must bless' || beròknāh|-
| rowspan="2" valign="top" | Infinitive || colspan="3" | Infinitive construct ||  L-BRK  (li-brūk) || = 'to bless' || berok|-
| colspan="3" | Infinitive absolute ||  BRK  (barōk) || = 'bless' || barōk|-
| rowspan="4" valign="top" | Participle(active) || rowspan="2" colspan="2" valign="top" | Singular || masc. ||  BRK  (būrek) || = '(a man:) blessing' || borēk|-
| fem. ||  BRKT  (būrekt) || = '(a woman:) blessing' || borèket, borekāh|-
| rowspan="2" valign="top" colspan="2" | Plural ||  masc. ||  BRKM  (bōrkīm) || = '(men:) blessing' || borekīm|-
| fem. || — (not attested) || '(women:) blessing' || borekōt|-
| rowspan="4" valign="top" | (passive) || rowspan="2" colspan="2" valign="top" | Singular || masc. || — (not attested) || '(a man:) blessed' || barūk|-
| fem. ||  BRKT  (barūkt) || = '(a woman:) blessed' || berūkāh|-
| rowspan="2" valign="top" colspan="2" | Plural ||  masc. ||  BRKM  (berūkīm) || = '(men:) blessed' || berūkīm|-
| fem. || — (not attested) || '(women:) blessed' || berūkōt|}

 Niph‘al 
The following Niph‘al forms are attested in Punic and Neo-Punic (verb:  P-‘-L, fel, 'to make'; < Phoenician pa‘ol):

 Pi‘el 
The following Pi‘el forms are attested in Punic and Neo-Punic (verb:  Ḥ-D-Š, ḥados, 'to make new, to restore'):

 Yiph‘il 
The following Yiph‘il forms are attested in Punic and Neo-Punic (verb:  Q-D-Š, qados, 'to dedicate'):

 Weak verbs 
Many (Neo-)Punic verbs are "weak": depending on the specific root consonants certain deviations of the standard verbal paradigm occur. For example in the group I-n (verbs with first consonant N-) the n may disappear through assimilation. Summary:

 Form and use 
In Punic there was no one-on-one correlation between form and use. For example, the suffix form (perfect) is often translated by a present tense, but it may also refer to the past or future. Tense, aspect, and mood of verbal forms were determined by syntax, not by morphology.

The tense, aspect and mood of a given verbal form may depend on:
 whether the form is part of the main clause, or of a subordinate clause;
 if in a subordinate clause, it may depend on the type of subordinate clause (for example, conditional, or temporal);
 word order may be important: does the verbal form precede or follow the subject of the clause?;
 it also may depend on a verbal form earlier in the same clause: suffix forms or an infinitive absolute used consecutive to another verbal form, take the same tense, aspect and mood as the preceding form.

 Numbers 
The numbers from one to ten are:

Punic and Neo-Punic take part in the so-called "Semitic polarity": the numbers 3-10 take the feminine form with masculine nouns, and vice versa. Thus with masculine BN (bin, 'son') or YM (yom, 'day'), numbers take the feminine form ending in -T, while with feminine ŠT (sat, 'year'), they take the masculine form without -T. For example:
 ‛W’ Š‛NT ‛SR WŠ‛LŠ (ḥawa’ sanūt ‛asar w-salūs): 'He lived (verb Ḥ-W-Y, 'to live') thirteen years' (KAI 144)

Multiples of ten take the form of a plural (-īm) of the word for 10 or 3-9:

One hundred is M’T (mīt), its dual M’TM (mitēm) is 200; 1000 is ’LP (’èlef), and 10,000 is RB’ (ribō).

 Particles 
An important particle is the so-called nota objecti, or accusative particle,  ’YT (’et) (rarely  ’T; usually T-  before a substantive with definite article or with demonstrative pronoun). It is placed before a substantive and indicates that that substantive is an object in the sentence (mostly a direct object).

 Syntax 
Word order in Punic and Neo-Punic can vary, but this variation has its grammatical limits. For example, in a clause with an imperfect prefixing form the subject can either precede or follow the verb. However, as a rule, if the verb precedes it refers to the present, while if the subject precedes, the verb refers to the future.

The repertoire of possible ways in (Neo-)Punic to express a certain combination of tense, aspect, and mood seems to be more restricted than in Phoenician, but at the same time the rules seem to have become less strict.

Example
Act V of Plautus's comedy Poenulus opens with Hanno speaking in Punic, his native language, in the first ten lines. Then follows a slightly different version of the same lines. Charles Krahmalkov is of the opinion that the first ten lines are Neo-Punic, the next ten Punic.Others have thought the language of lines 940-949 (italicized) may be Hebrew, or Libyc, one of the Berber languages. However, Libyc is a very different language, and Plautus certainly did not assume Hanno to be a Jew.

Krahmalkov proposed the theory that Plautus, who often translated Greek comedies into Latin, in this case too reworked a Greek original, the Karkhedonios ('The Carthaginian'; Athenian comic poet Alexis wrote a play with this title). In this case, there probably also existed a Punic translation of the Greek comedy, and Plautus took parts of this Punic version to give his Carthaginian character authentic speech. Moreover, in this way he could enter puns by introducing in his play would-be translators who, to comical effect, claimed to, but did not in fact, understand Punic, and thus gave nonsensical 'translations'.

 Hanno's Punic speech 

Plautus (or a later redactor) next provided a Latin translation of the preceding lines:

Latin and English translation

Comments
As a Latin transliteration, the text as recorded necessarily departs from the original Punic speech. Lines 930-939 have only servived in one manuscript, the "Ambrosianus" A (the "Ambrosian Palimpsest"). The "unknown" text, lines 940-949, has also survived in three manuscripts of the Palatine family (P). The several manuscript sources show many differences among them, with the P scripts showing some words being split out and some mis-interpretations. The "unknown" text used here is from the Ambrosianus A; both families have lost small chunks of text over time. Recently efforts have been made to, among other things, fill in the redactions in the "unknown language" part and to properly split the morphemes. The close mirroring between lines 930-931/940 and lines 937/947 (underlined above) suggests that the "unknown language" text (lines 940-949) is also Punic. Gratwick and Krahmalkov conclude that the more corrupted "unknown" form (940-949) is earlier (basically Plautus's own text in Punic), while lines 930-939 reflect a “late 'scholar's repair'” from Late Antiquity in Neo-Punic. 

Some Punic phrases known in the text include:
 930/940: Yth alonim ualoniuth sicorathii (sthymhimi) hymacom syth = ’YT ’LNM W-’LNT ZKRT (Š-QRYT?; [940:] ŠTMḤW?) H-MQM ST.
 - yth = ’et, accusative particle (nota objecti): indicates that an object follows (cf. Hebrew ’et)
 - alonim = ’alonīm: plural masculine of ’alōn: 'gods' (cf. Hebrew ’elōah, 'god, goddess', plural ’elohîm); = Latin deōs; cf. alonim in 933 ~ di ('gods') in 953
 - u- = w-, 'and' (Hebrew w-); = Latin -que - aloniuth = ’alonōt: plural feminine of ’alōn: 'goddesses (of)'; = Latin deās - sicorathi: corresponds with Hebrew zakàrti, 'I have been mindful of, I remember, I keep holy'; = Latin veneror (note: s in sicorathi ~ z in zakàrti: in late Punic the four Phoenician sibilants, s, š, ș, and z, were all pronounced /s/); also interpreted as si-qart, '(of) this city', but that is less probable because then a verb is missing in the sentence, and it would make hymacom syth, 'this city', superfluous.
 - hymacom: ha-maqōm, definite article + 'place, city' (Hebrew hammaqōm); = Latin urbem ('city'). Note: variant symacom syth (line 930) = šè + maqōm syth, 'of this city'. mucom in 948 is also maqōm.
 - syth: demonstrative pronoun 'this', singular feminine (Hebrew: zōt) or masculine (Hebrew: zèh) = Latin hanc (in Hebrew maqōm, 'place, city', usually is a masculine word, but occasionally it can be feminine). In 940P esse is the Plautine Punic spelling, 930 and 940A have the late Neo-Punic spelling syth.
 937/947: yth emanethi hy chirs aelichot / sitt esed anec naso ters ahelicot = ’T-M ’NKY H’ ḤRŠ (YŠ) H-HLYKT / Š-’TY ’Z ’NK NŠ’ ḤRŠ H-HLYKT.
 - yth = ’et: probably the accusative particle again, here indicating an indirect object ('for', 'to'; = Latin ad); or it may be the preposition ’et, 'with' (cf. Latin mecum, 'with me')
 - esed = zdè: demonstrative pronoun, singular masculine, 'this, this one' (Hebrew: zèh); = Latin eum ('him'). In 947P ese the original Plautine Punic spelling has been preserved.
 - anec: personal pronoun 1st person, 'I, I myself' (Hebrew anoki) (emanethi in 937 is a corrupt spelling, read (-em) anethi, with ch misread as th, and anechi = 'I, I myself')
 - naso = našō’: infinitive absolute of the verb N-Š-’, 'to carry, bring': 'I bring' (Hebrew N-Ś-’, 'to lift, bear, carry'); = Latin fero, 'I bring' (in Punic an infinitive absolute, if consecutive to the main verb, represents the same tense, aspect, person, number and gender as the main verb, in this case a first person singular, cf. anec)
 - chirs / (ters): substantive, construct state, 'potsherd of' (Hebrew ḥèreś, 'pottery, potsherd'); = Latin tesseram, 'tile'
 - aelichot / ahelicot = ha-helikōt: definite article + substantive plural, 'the hospitality, the guest-friendship' (cf. Hebrew hēlèk, 'visitor'); = Latin hospitalem (a «tessera hospitalis» was an object a guest presented to be recognized)
 duber, dubyr in 936, 946, 948: Semitic root D-B-R, 'to speak, word'
 fel, 'he did' (935), li-ful (935) and lu-ful (945), 'to do' (infinitive construct): Semitic root P-‘-L, 'to make, to do'.

References

Further reading
Hoftijzer, Jacob, and Karel Jongeling. 1985. Dictionary of the north-west Semitic inscriptions. With appendices by R. C. Steiner, A. Mosak-Moshavi, and B. Porten. 2 vols. Handbuch der Orienatlistik, Erste Abteilung: Der Nahe und Mittlere Osten 2. Leiden, The Netherlands: Brill.
Jongeling, K. 2008. Handbook of Neo-Punic Inscriptions. Tübingen: Mohr Siebeck.
Jongeling, K., and Robert M Kerr. 2005. Late Punic Epigraphy: An Introduction to the Study of Neo-Punic and Latino-Punic Inscriptions. Tübingen: Mohr Siebeck.
Kerr, Robert M. 2010. Latino-Punic Epigraphy: A Descriptive Study of the Inscriptions. Tübingen: Mohr Siebeck.
Krahmalkov, Charles. 1970. "Studies in Phoenician and Punic Grammar." Journal of Semitic Studies 15, no.2: 181–88.
--. 2000. Phoenician-Punic dictionary. Studia Phoenicia 15. Leuven, Belgium: Peeters.
--. 2001. A Phoenician-Punic grammar. Handbook of Oriental Studies: Section One, the Near East and the Middle East 54. Leiden, The Netherlands: Brill.
Schmitz, Philip C. "Phoenician-Punic Grammar and Lexicography in the New Millennium." Journal of the American Oriental Society 124, no. 3 (2004): 533-47. doi:10.2307/4132279.
Segert, Stanislav. 1976. A Grammar of Phoenician and Punic. München: C.H. Beck.
--. 2003. "Phoenician-punic: Grammar and dictionary." Archiv Orientální 71. no. 4: 551–56.
Tomback, Richard S. 1978. A comparative Semitic lexicon of the Phoenician and Punic languages.'' Missoula, MT: Scholars.

External links
 Punic alphabet on Omniglot.com
 Phoenician fonts from unicode

 
Extinct languages of Africa
Extinct languages of Europe
Phoenician language
Canaanite languages
Carthage
Languages attested from the 8th century BC
Languages extinct in the 5th century
Languages of Sicily